Ian Fitchuk (born February 13, 1982) is a songwriter, music producer, composer and multi-instrumentalist.

Early life 
Fitchuk was born and raised in Chicago by parents who are both accomplished classical musicians and educators. He cites Paul Simon's Graceland as a significant musical influence from an early age. He moved to Nashville in 2000 to study jazz piano at Belmont University. He was quickly recruited to play keyboard by local band Llama who was on MCA Records at the time. After leaving the band, he began producing artists like Amy Grant, Mindy Smith, Landon Pigg, Jeremy Lister and Griffin House with production partner Justin Loucks.

Career 
Fitchuk is a 2x Grammy Award winning musician, producer, and songwriter. He has played drums and keyboards on albums for artists including Shania Twain, Sam Hunt's debut album Montevallo, Lucie Silvas, Andrew Combs, Sean McConnell, and James Bay's debut album Chaos and the Calm. In 2016, he co-wrote and produced "Bummin' Cigarettes" by Maren Morris on her album Hero. In 2018 along with Nashville singer-songwriter Daniel Tashian, he co-produced Grammy award winner Kacey Musgraves' Golden Hour. It was Musgraves' fourth studio album released on March 30, 2018. Golden Hour earned Best Country Album and Album Of The Year honors at the 2019 Grammy awards, as well as Album Of The Year honors at the 2018 CMA awards and the 2019 ACM awards. Fitchuk was tapped again to work with Musgraves on Disney's 2019 Frozen II soundtrack, producing the song "All Is Found".

Discography

Accolades

References

External links
 

1982 births
American people of Ukrainian descent
American multi-instrumentalists
Record producers from Illinois
Musicians from Chicago
Living people
American session musicians
Belmont University alumni
American country musicians
21st-century American keyboardists
American male songwriters
21st-century American male musicians